"Do It! Now" is the 15th single of J-pop idol group Morning Musume and was released July 24, 2002,. It sold a total of 310,600 copies.

Overview
This single also marked the last appearance of Maki Goto before she graduated from Morning Musume and pursued a solo career within Hello! Project. This song broke the string of #1 hits originating from 1999's Love Machine, receiving a #3 position on Oricon.

An English-language cover was recorded by Mylin for the album Cover Morning Musume Hello! Project!.

Track listing 
 "Do It! Now"
 
 "Do It! Now (Instrumental)"

Members at time of single 
 1st generation: Kaori Iida, Natsumi Abe
 2nd generation: Kei Yasuda, Mari Yaguchi
 3rd generation: Maki Goto 
 4th generation: Rika Ishikawa, Hitomi Yoshizawa, Nozomi Tsuji, Ai Kago 
 5th generation: Ai Takahashi, Asami Konno, Makoto Ogawa, Risa Niigaki

References

External links 
 Do It! Now entry on the Hello! Project official website

Morning Musume songs
Zetima Records singles
2002 singles
Song recordings produced by Tsunku
2002 songs
Electronic dance music songs
Japanese synth-pop songs
Songs written by Tsunku